Lee Chul-woo (born February 20, 1939) is a member of the Gyeongsangbuk-do Provincial Council, the chief legislative body of Gyeongsangbuk-do, South Korea.  He is the current chairperson of the council (until June 2006).  He represents Cheongdo County.

Lee is a graduate of Dongseong High School in Busan.
Lee has served in the Provincial Council since its re-establishment in 1991.  In addition to his current term as chairperson, he served as vice-chair in the previous Council.

Lee is also the chair of the Gyeongsangbuk-do council of the Federation of Korean Trade Unions.

See also
Politics of South Korea
List of Koreans

External links
Korean-language profile

South Korean politicians
People from North Gyeongsang Province
Living people
1939 births